Patkura (Sl. No.: 96) is a Vidhan Sabha constituency of Kendrapara district, Odisha.

This constituency includes Derabish block, Garadapur and 7 Gram panchayats (Jalapoka, Karilopatna, Aitipur, Jamapada, Mehendinagar, Bachharai and Bandhakata) of Marshaghai block.

Elected members

Sixteen elections were held between 1951 and 2014 including one By-Poll in 1980.

Elected members from the Patkura constituency are:

2019: (96): Sabitri Agarwal (BJD)
2014: (96): Bed Prakash Agarwal (BJD)
2009: (96): Bed Prakash Agarwal (BJD)
2004: (34): Atanu Sabyasachi Nayak (BJD)
2000: (34): Trilochan Behera (AITMC)
1995: (34): Bijoy Mohapatra (Janata Dal)
1990: (34): Bijoy Mohapatra (Janata Dal)
1985: (34): Bijoy Mohapatra (Janata Party)
1980: (By-Poll): Bijoy Mohapatra (JNP (SC))
1980: (34): Biju Patnaik (JNP (SC))
1977: (34): Prahallad Mallick (Janata Party)
1974: (34): Rajkishore Nayak (UTC)
1971: (32): Rajkishore Nayak (UTC)
1967: (32): C.Satapathi (PSP)
1961: (109): Lokanath Misra (PSP)
1957: (77): Lokanath Misra (Congress)
1951: (70): Lokanath Misra (Congress)

Election results

2019

2014

2009
In 2009 election, Biju Janata Dal candidate Bed Prakash Agrawalla defeated Bharatiya Janata Party candidate Bijoy Mohapatra by a margin of 26,735 votes.

Notes

References

Assembly constituencies of Odisha
Kendrapara district